Almoda Rana Uprety is a Nepalese singer. He has released songs such as "Funtastic (Pani Paryo)", "Kaile Vetne Khai" , "Timi Ma Sanga", Kaile Vetne Khai 2 (Nyasro)" and "Jyanle Timlai".

Early life 
Almoda started his career after being the second runner up in a national level broadcast singing competition Nepal Star – 2005 at the age of 16. He achieved a music degree from SOAS, University of London and Kathmandu University specializing in ethnomusicology.

Discography

Features 
Featured song

Cover songs

Filmography

Social contribution

Awards 
Almoda has been awarded with:
 A NEFTA Award for the movie Jerry
 Hits FM Awards for Best Pop Vocal Performance for Funtastic (Pani Paryo)

After releasing Pani Paryo he has been awarded and nominated at some awards and this song was Nepal's most streamed song of 2016.

References

External links 
 
 Almoda in IMDb

1988 births
Living people
21st-century Nepalese male singers
Nepalese playback singers